Captain Underpants and the Big, Bad Battle of the Bionic Booger Boy are the sixth and seventh books in the Captain Underpants series by Dav Pilkey. The first part was published on August 1, 2003, and the second part was published on September 30, 2003. The books feature the debut of George and Harold's new pets Sulu (a hamster with a bionic endoskeleton) and Crackers (a Quetzalcoatlus) who first appeared in the first and second parts respectively. The second part also features the debut of time travel in the series, which would become a core theme of the series later on.

Plot summary

Part 1: The Night of the Nasty Nostril Nuggets
Ms. Ribble's fourth-grade english class are having demonstration speech day. The first two boys got a A+‘Stephanie Yakoff and Jessica Gorgon tried to cook in pop-up toaster. Then, George and Harold show off the "Banana"; two banana packets under the bumps of a toilet seat which will squirt the bananas on whoever sits on the seat. But Melvin then forces everyone to watch his demonstration, the "Combine-o-Tron 2000", which he uses to combine his hamster Sulu with a bionic hamster body he built. Melvin orders Sulu to do some farts for the class, but the hamster is unaware of what happened, causing Melvin to threaten to spank him. Sulu's "instincts" kick in and cause him to spank Melvin himself using his new bionic powers, causing Melvin to harshly disown Sulu. After watching the scene, George and Harold adopt Sulu, who happily joins the two. Meanwhile, Ms. Ribble uses a Banana on an already grumpy Mr. Krupp, who believes that George and Harold are responsible, additionally seeing other banana victims. When Mr. Krupp finds them in the lunchroom, Melvin immediately tattles on the boys and Mr. Krupp sends them to detention, causing them to make a Bad Captain Underpants comic starring Melvin as a dumb tattletale.

Having read the comic, Melvin angrily goes home and builds a new super-powered robot to combine himself with using the Combine-O-Tron 2000, believing he will be revered and celebrated by the school and town. However, Melvin sneezes at the last second from his allergy to cats and gets combined with the robot and his boogers, turning him into the Robo Booger Boy, and will remain so for six months until he finishes a molecular separator. As time passes, Melvin becomes a sports star due to his repulsiveness and is able to use his own drinking fountain. The cold and flu season begins, however, and Melvin makes a huge mess whenever he sneezes. When the class visits a tissue factory, Melvin becomes extremely paranoid to the point of misusing pronouns. When factory owner Snoddy offers free farts, Melvin becomes gigantic as a natural defense and goes on a rampage, capturing the school secretary, Miss Edith Anthrope. George turns Mr. Krupp into Captain Underpants who saves, Miss Anthrope. Her wet kisses turn him back to Mr. Krupp and the Robo Booger Boy devours him, but Sulu defeats the Robo Booger Boy using large novelty items from warehouses.

When Melvin's parents arrive with the Combine-o-Tron 2000, George suggests reversing the batteries, which surprisingly works, and the Robo Booger Boy is split into Melvin, Mr. Krupp, and three robotic booger globs. However, Mr. Krupp and Melvin begin acting strangely, with Mr. Krupp boasting about the Combine-O-Tron 2000 saving the city, and Melvin threatening the boys with detention. Suddenly, the globs come to life, smash the Combine-O-Tron 2000 and begin chasing George, Harold, Mr. Krupp, Melvin, and Sulu.

Part 2: The Revenge of the Ridiculous Robo-Boogers
The globs continue chasing George, Harold, Mr Krupp, Melvin, and Sulu. But before George and Harold better run, they switch letters on the cool sign. They reach a dead end, but Sulu catches the Robo-Boogers in his mouth and spits them out into space towards Uranus. After a number of incidents, George and Harold realize that Mr. Krupp and Melvin had switched bodies. Since it would take Melvin six months to build another Combine-O-Tron 2000, George suggests going back in time, which makes Melvin snap his fingers, causing Mr. Krupp to turn into Captain Underpants and fly away. George and Harold are forced to tell the secret and Melvin orders them to create a comic about him as a superhero, telling them to give him a cool name and to not make him look stupid, before starting to build a time machine out of a Porta Potty. The next day, Melvin is furious that the comic is not what he asked for (George and Harold claimed to have thought he said to give him a stupid name and to not make him look cool), but soon explains to them how the time machine works and warns them about using it two days in a row, saying something will place the world in a catastrophe. He also gives them the "Forgetchamacallit 2000", which erases several minutes from one's memory, as well as a decoy Combine-O-Tron 2000. George and Harold travel two days back in time.

In the past, George and Harold dress like a man who claims to be giving Melvin's father a science award, but first needing to inspect the Combine-O-Tron 2000. They replace the real invention with the fake one and use the Forgetchamacallit 2000 to erase Melvin's father's memory of what had happened. However, on the way back, the boys encounter Miss Singerbrains the librarian who steals the inventions and plans on reporting them to the police. George and Harold then travel to the Cretaceous period and get a female Quetzalcoatlus, who they nickname "Crackers". They then fly to Singerbrains, who is driving to the police station. George convinces her she is dreaming because of "the dinosaur's presence", etc. After flying back to the school, Harold returns Crackers, then they erase Singerbrains memory, and travel to the present. Over the last two days, Captain Underpants has been getting himself in trouble, first helping two old ladies cross the street, stopping to rescue a cat from a tree, but accidentally leaving the ladies up there. Then, he ruins the football game for the Jerome-Horwitz football team, shortly afterwards getting on the bad side of some skateboarders. After Melvin programs the Combine-O-Tron 2000, George and Harold combine Melvin and Captain Underpants and then separate them with their correct minds.

In space, the Robo-Boogers land on a Space Shuttle, hanging on as it returns to Earth, after which they eat it, then begin eating the airport they landed at, growing bigger with each bite. Captain Underpants tries to go off to help but discovers that his powers were moved to Melvin's body, who refuses to help unless George and Harold change the comic. George and Harold refuse, and go to help Captain Underpants, after being cornered at a local store, they begin throwing random items stacked outside at the Robo-Boogers. By chance, one eats an orange and is killed due to the levels of Vitamin C. While the boys try to throw more oranges at the remaining two, now cautious, Robo-Boogers, Captain Underpants takes two crates and puts them under the seat of a giant toilet on a building, and makes a deliberately annoying "Underpants Dance", angering the Robo-Boogers, which grab onto the seat to hoist themselves on the building, causing the crushed crates to squeeze orange juice on them (a call-back to the "squishy" prank from the first book), killing them both.

Soon, the Eyewitness News crew arrives, and Melvin suddenly appears as "Big Melvin" and lies that he defeated the Robo-Boogers, and then tries to make Captain Underpants give up his hero status (including spanking him) though he refuses. George and Harold return with Melvin's machines from the school, first using the Combine-O-Tron 2000 to transfer Captain Underpants's powers back to him, and then using the Forgetchamacallit 2000 to erase the news crew and audience's memories. After the now powerless Melvin throws a tantrum, all the people that Captain Underpants (while in Melvin's body) annoyed recognize Melvin, form an angry mob and chase him in retribution. When the boys return to their treehouse, George finds out that Harold didn't really send Crackers back and had left her with Sulu. George decides she could stay in the present for just one night but they had to return her tomorrow. But the next day, when George, Harold and Sulu are ready to take Crackers back where she belongs, the time machine malfunctions because it was used for two days in a row.

Comics

Captain Underpants and the Terrifying Tale of the Tattle-Tron 2000 (From Part 1) 
Melvin is a huge snitch who tattles on everything. One day, Melvin tells on a bank robber to the police, which makes him so famous that he wins the election he takes by a landslide. Melvin first becomes Mayor. Over the days people make him the protector of the town, that makes him make a bunch of dumb new rules. The jails fill up so quickly that he is forced to create a giant robot one. Underpants easily escapes out of the robot jail. He does not want to hurt the people inside, but pours a giant bottle of "Mrs. Plop's Prune Juice" into the robot jail's mouth, making it shoot out the prisoners. He then breaks open Melvin's glass dome. Melvin is now sent to the "jail for dumb kids." The town goes back to normal.

Captain Underpants and the War of the Willy Wonder Nerd (From Part 2)

While driven to the nuclear waste dump, a waste barrel falls on a cotton field, where the cotton grows to an unbelievable size. One day, is it made into "Glow In the Dark underwear" and Melvin's mother gives him one from a big sale. Overnight, Melvin grows into a giant. The police spots him the next morning and calls the military. Then Underpants flies in and notices a tag on the back saying it will shrink if washed. Then, Melvin takes Underpants to the lake, but his underwear becomes soaked. Underpants asks a passing bird to pop Melvin, which it does, before Melvin is whisked away to a "Jail for Dumb Stupid Nerds".

Characters
 George Beard – A 4th-grade student in Jerome Horwitz Elementary School. Harold's 9 year old best friend
 Harold Hutchins – A 4th-grade student in Jerome Horwitz Elementary School. George's 10 year old best friend
 Mr. Krupp – George and Harold's mean principal who is hypnotised by them.
 Captain Underpants – The alter ego of Mr. Krupp.
 Melvin Sneedly – George and Harold's nemesis and the school's brainiac and tattletale. He serves as the main antagonist in Part 1, where he accidentally morphs into the Bionic Booger Boy. When the class tours the Snoddy Bros. Tissue Factory, it makes Melvin horrified, in fact, the more he is, the bigger he grows, turning into a giant rampaging boogery monster.
 Sulu – Melvin's hamster (now George and Harold's bionic hamster).
 Ms. Ribble – George and Harold's nice teacher. In Part 1, when Booger Boy Melvin sneezes all over the class, it covers Ribble in slimy green mucus. The next day, while she stays at home, Mr. Krupp becomes her substitute.
 Miss Anthrope – The secretary of Jerome Horwitz Elementary School.
 Mr. Meaner – George and Harold's gym teacher and coach of the Purple Dragon Sing-Along Friends (Only appeared in Part 2).
Angry old ladies - The angry old ladies who got stuck on a tree by Captain Underpants (as Melvin Sneedly). (Only appeared in Part 2.)
Skateboarders - 3 skateboarders who got their skateboards broken and got spanked by Captain Underpants (as Melvin Sneedly). (Only appeared in Part 2).
 Crackers – A purple pterodactyl. (only appeared in Part 2.)
 Miss Singerbrains – The school librarian who got fired by Mr Krupp (Melvin)
 Super Diaper Baby – He made a cameo in George and Harold's comic (Super Diaper Baby 2.5) in Part 1.
 Mr. Snoddy – The owner of the Snoddy Bros. Tissue Factory.
 The Robo-Boogers – Three snot monsters, who serve as the main antagonists in Part 2. Their names are Carl, Trixie, and Frankenbooger. They are formed after Bionic Booger Boy exploded at the end of Part 1. At the beginning of Part 2, Sulu the Bionic Hamster swallows all three Robo-Boogers whole and shoots them to space. Unfortunately, they land on a space shuttle headed to Uranus. The Robo-Boogers are defeated by the orange juice (from Vitamin C), which contaminates the cold and flu that makes the Robo-Boogers evil.
 Major Tomski – The head astronaut of the POOPSIE Space Shuttle.

External links
Captain Underpants official site
Dav Pilkey official site

2003 American novels
Captain Underpants novels
Novels about time travel
Scholastic Corporation books